Rudolph Frank Moore (March 17, 1927October 19, 2008), known as Rudy Ray Moore, was an American comedian, singer, actor, and film producer. He created the character Dolemite, the pimp from the 1975 film Dolemite and its sequels, The Human Tornado and The Dolemite Explosion (aka The Return of Dolemite). The persona was developed during his early comedy records. The recordings often featured Moore delivering profanity-filled rhyming poetry, which later earned Moore the nickname "the Godfather of Rap." Actor and comedian Eddie Murphy portrayed Moore in the 2019 film Dolemite Is My Name.

Early life
Moore was born and raised in and lived in the Johnson House on 1400 North 12th Street Fort Smith, Arkansas, and eventually moved to Akron, Ohio, and then Milwaukee, Wisconsin. In Milwaukee, he preached in churches and worked as a nightclub dancer. He returned to Akron, working in clubs as a singer, dancer, and comedian, often appearing in character as Prince DuMarr. He joined the US Army and served in an entertainment unit in Germany, where he was nicknamed the Harlem Hillbilly for singing country songs in an R&B style. He developed an interest in comedy in the Army after expanding on a singing performance for other servicemen.

After his honorable discharge he lived in Seattle, Washington and then Los Angeles, where he continued to work in clubs and was discovered by record producer Dootsie Williams. He recorded rhythm and blues songs for the Federal, Cash, Ball, Kent, and Imperial labels between 1955 and 1962, and released his first comedy albums, Below the Belt (1961), The Beatnik Scene (1962), and A Comedian Is Born (1964).

Career

Dolemite records and wider acclaim
By his own account, he was working at the world famous Dolphin's of Hollywood record store in Los Angeles, California in 1970 when he began hearing obscene stories of "Dolemite" recounted by a local man named Rico.   Moore recorded a number of street poets, including Big Brown who, before he moved to Los Angeles, had been an influence on Bob Dylan, among other artists, while living in Greenwich Village. (Dylan said Brown's poetry was the best poetry he had ever heard.)  In 1973, Moore produced Brown's album, The First Man of Poetry, Big Brown: Between Heaven and Hell.

According to Moore, there was a wino named Rico, and Moore heard him on the street corner doing all these raps and rhymes:

Moore began recording the stories, and assumed the role of "Dolemite" in his club act and on recordings. In 1970–71 he recorded three albums of material, Eat Out More Often, This Pussy Belongs To Me, and The Dirty Dozens, where "with jazz and R&B musicians playing in the background, [Moore] would recite raunchy, sexually explicit rhymes that often had to do with pimps, prostitutes, players, and hustlers."

Moore was influenced by more mainstream comedians such as Redd Foxx and Richard Pryor, as well as by traditions such as the Dozens. The recordings were usually made in Moore's apartment, with friends in attendance to give a party atmosphere. The album covers and contents were often too racy to be put on display in record stores, but the records became popular through word of mouth and were highly successful in Black American communities, where his "warped wit and anti-establishment outlook" were embraced.

Dolemite movie and later success

Moore spent most of his earnings from the records to finance the movie Dolemite, which started filming in January, 1974. It was released and distributed nationally beginning in April 1975, and has been described as "one of the great blaxploitation movies" of the 1970s. The character was "the ultimate ghetto hero: a bad dude, profane, skilled at kung-fu, dressed to kill and hell-bent on protecting the community from evil menaces. He was a pimp with a kung-fu-fighting clique of prostitutes and he was known for his sexual prowess."

The film was successful and was followed by The Human Tornado, The Monkey Hustle, and Petey Wheatstraw: The Devil's Son-in-Law. Moore continued to release albums that appealed to his enduring fanbase through the 1970s and 1980s, but little of his work reached a white audience. His "rapid-fire rhyming salaciousness exceeded the wildest excesses" of Foxx and Pryor, and his highly explicit style kept him off television and major films. At the same time, Moore often spoke in his church and regularly took his mother to the National Baptist Convention. He said that: "I wasn't saying dirty words just to say them... It was a form of art, sketches in which I developed ghetto characters who cursed. I don't want to be referred to as a dirty old man, rather a ghetto expressionist."

Later career
In 1990, Moore appeared on Big Daddy Kane's album Taste of Chocolate and Eric B. & Rakim's music video for "In The Ghetto".  Four years later, he appeared on Method Man's album Tical and 2 Live Crew's album Back at Your Ass for the Nine-4.  2 Live Crew attributed their use of obscenity-laden lyrics to Moore's act. After appearing on a 1995 episode of Martin titled "The Players Came Home", he reprised the Dolemite character for the intro of Busta Rhymes' album When Disaster Strikes... Snoop Dogg's 1999 album No Limit Top Dogg, and Ol' Dirty Bastard‘s 1999 music video "Got Your Money“, in which the rapper was digitally inserted into scenes of Dolemite.  He again reprised Dolemite in the 2000 film Big Money Hustlas, a film created by and starring the rap-rock group Insane Clown Posse.  In 2001, Moore was a featured guest in the intro of Busta Rhymes' album Genesis. Five years later, Moore voice-acted in the show Sons of Butcher, as Rudy in season 2. Moore reprised the character Petey Wheatstraw on the 2008 song "I Live for the Funk", which featured Blowfly and Daniel Jordan. It marked the first time Blowfly and Moore collaborated on the same record together, as well as the 30-year anniversary of the movie Petey Wheatstraw; it was also the final recording Moore made before his death.

Personal life
Moore never married. His long-time manager, Donald Randall, said in 2012 that Moore had both female and male lovers. Entertainer Stanton Z. LaVey, a friend of Moore's, said in 2019 that Moore was "very much bisexual, if not gay", and that his Dolemite persona helped cover it up.

Death 
On October 19, 2008, Moore died in Akron, Ohio, of complications from diabetes. His mother, two brothers, a sister, a daughter, and grandchildren survived him.

Legacy
He came to be regarded as a major influence by many later rap stars. Snoop Dogg said that "without Rudy Ray Moore, there would be no Snoop Dogg, and that's for real."

On June 7, 2018, it was announced that Craig Brewer would direct Dolemite Is My Name from a script by Scott Alexander and Larry Karaszewski with Netflix producing and distributing and Eddie Murphy starring as Moore. Later that month, the rest of the principal cast was announced. In July 2018, Chris Rock and Ron Cephas Jones joined the cast. Principal photography began on June 12, 2018. In August 2019, the trailer was released. The film premiered at the Toronto International Film Festival on September 7, 2019, and received a limited release on October 4, 2019, before digital streaming on October 25, 2019.

In January 2022, a detailed biography, Thank You For Letting Me Be Myself: The Authorized Biography of Rudy Ray Moore aka Dolemite by Mark Jason Murray, was released.  It was noted as the definitive story on Moore's entire life, career and legacy.

Discography

Albums
Below the Belt (1959)
Beatnik Scene (1962)
A Comedian Is Born (1964)
Let's Come Together (1970, recorded 1967)
Eat Out More Often (1970) (Kent KST 001)
This Pussy Belongs to Me (1971) (Kent KST 002) - with "The Signifying Monkee"
Dolemite for President (1972)
Merry Christmas, Baby
The Cockpit - with "Petey Wheatstraw - The Devil's Son-in-Law"
Return of Dolemite (featuring The Grunts & Groans of Love)
The Sensuous Black Man - by "The Prince"
Zodiac
I Can't Believe I Ate the Whole Thing
Jokes by Redd Foxx
Live in Concert
The Player—The Hustler
House Party: Dirty Dozens Vol. 1
The Streaker
Dolemite Is Another Crazy Nigger
Sweet Peeter Jeeter
The Turning Point
Close Encounter of the Sex Kind
Good-Ole Big Ones
Hip-Shakin' Papa
Greatest Hits (1995)
When Disaster Strikes... - Busta Rhymes (Moore appears on "Intro" track) (1997, Elektra 62064-1)
This Ain't No White Christmas
Raw, Rude, and Real—More Greatest Hits
Phantom Surfers - XXX Party (2000)
21st-Century Dolemite (2002)
Hully Gully Fever
Genius of Rudy Ray Moore
Reconnect: Vol. 1B - various (2007, Acacia Records ACACIA CD-1B) (Moore appears on the two "Godfather of Rap" tracks)
Dolemite for President — Special Edition (2008)
50 Years of Cussing (2009)
50 Years of Cussing, Vol. 2 (2019)

Singles
"Step It Up and Go" (King Records)
"Below the Belt" (Dooto)
"The Roosevelt" (Dooto)
"Let's Come Together"
"My Soul" - The Seniors (Ball 001)
"Rally in the Valley" (Vermont 105-45)
"Hully Gully Papa" (Case Records 1006)

Filmography

References

External links

 Rudy Ray Moore official Web site
 
 Dolemite Records
 Sweet Peter Jeeter, audio of LP
 Rudy Ray Moore Record Label
 Zolten, Jerry, "'I Ain't Lyin'!' The Unexpurgated Truth about Rudy Ray Moore." Living Blues # 157, May/June 2001.
 ZZZlist.com 2007 interview with Rudy Ray Moore
 Rudy Ray Moore dies at the age of 81
 MTV Obituary

1927 births
2008 deaths
African-American male actors
African-American male comedians
20th-century African-American male singers
American male comedians
Male actors from Arkansas
Singers from Arkansas
Norton Records artists
Deaths from diabetes
People from Fort Smith, Arkansas
Male actors from Cleveland
Imperial Records artists
Kent Records artists
20th-century American singers
Comedians from Ohio
20th-century American comedians
21st-century American comedians
Comedians from Arkansas
Comedians from California
20th-century American male singers
21st-century African-American people